The Wants are an American no wave band from New York City.

History 
Madison Velding-VanDam and Jason Gates first met in the Brooklyn music scene in 2014 and formed The Wants in 2016. In 2018 and 2019 they began recording and touring, including in 2019 performing at SXSW, ahead of their first studio album, Container, which came out on March 13, 2020.

Container was met with positive critical reviews.

Musical Style 
In an interview with AdHoc Magazine, Velding-VanDam described their sound as a fusion of Detroit techno and New York City post-punk.

Discography

Studio albums 
 Container (2020)

Singles 
 "Clearly A Crisis" (2019)
 "Fear My Society" (2019)
 "The Motor" (2020)
 "Container" (2020)

References

External links
The Motor (May 28, 2020) Music video filmed in Detroit, Michigan

2016 establishments in New York City
American musical trios
No wave groups
Musical groups from New York City
American post-punk music groups
Musical groups established in 2016
Council Records artists